Zaneveld Glacier is a broad tributary glacier, flowing from the polar plateau northwest between Roberts Massif and Cumulus Hills to enter the upper part of Shackleton Glacier. Named by Advisory Committee on Antarctic Names (US-ACAN) for Jacques S. Zaneveld, United States Antarctic Research Program (USARP) biologist at McMurdo Station, 1963–64 and 1964–65, who participated in the cruise of the USS Glacier, January–March 1965.

Glaciers of Dufek Coast